The centenary of the outbreak of World War I was commemorated in Europe in late July and early August 2014. A century earlier, the July Crisis, which occurred after the assassination of Archduke Franz Ferdinand, had culminated in Austria-Hungary declaring war on the Kingdom of Serbia, which Austria-Hungary blamed for the assassination, on 28 July 1914. Over the following days and weeks, this action and the invasion of Luxembourg and Belgium by the German Empire led to a succession of other declarations of war that drew the major European powers into a worldwide conflict. A century later, governments in Europe held a series of official commemorative events to mark the occasion.

Hartmannswillerkopf
On 3 August 2014, the centenary of Germany's declaration of war on France was marked by French President François Hollande and German President Joachim Gauck, who together laid the first stone of a new joint memorial at Hartmannswillerkopf for French and German soldiers killed in the war. Over 30,000 soldiers from both sides died in the fighting here at the Battle of Hartmannswillerkopf. The site, in the Vosges mountains of Alsace in France, is the location of a cemetery and a crypt containing the ashes of 12,000 unknown soldiers. The presidents observed a minute's silence in the crypt.

Allied memorial at Liège
On the morning of 4 August 2014, leaders and representatives of 83 countries gathered at the Allied Memorial at Cointe on the outskirts of Liège to commemorate the invasion of Belgium by Germany and the Battle of Liège. Representing Belgium were Philippe, King of the Belgians and Queen Mathilde, together with the Presidents of France and Germany, François Hollande and Joachim Gauck. Representatives were present from the United Kingdom, the United States, Spain, Italy, Ireland, Serbia, Romania and the European Commission. Speeches were given by King Philippe, Hollande, Gauck, and Prince William, Duke of Cambridge. The commemoration culminated in the laying of a wreath of white roses at the memorial by King Philippe.

Saint Symphorien cemetery
On the evening of 4 August 2014, a commemorative event was held at St Symphorien cemetery in Belgium. Originally built by the Germans during the war, and containing both German and British graves, this cemetery is now maintained by the Commonwealth War Graves Commission. The commemorative event here marked the losses at the Battle of Mons. Those attending the event and ceremony included King Philippe and Queen Mathilde representing Belgium. Representing the United Kingdom were Prince William, Catherine, Duchess of Cambridge and Prince Harry. Politicians present included German President Joachim Gauck, Belgian Prime Minister Elio Di Rupo, and British Prime Minister David Cameron. Also present was Justin Welby, the Archbishop of Canterbury. The event was broadcast on television by the British Broadcasting Corporation, with narration by historian Dan Snow, accompanied with readings, music and poetry about the history of the war. Wreath-laying and a silence was followed by the playing of The Last Post.

Westminster Abbey
The final event of commemoration on 4 August 2014 was held in London at Westminster Abbey, with a service and a candlelit vigil. This was part of the 'Lights Out' event inspired by the words of Sir Edward Grey, foreign secretary during the outbreak of the war: "The lamps are going out all over Europe; we shall not see them lit again in our lifetime." Those present at the service included Camilla, Duchess of Cornwall, the Deputy Prime Minister Nick Clegg and Labour leader Ed Miliband. The culmination of the service was a vigil at the Tomb of The Unknown Warrior. Part of the same 'Lights Out' event was the Spectra installation, with 49 beams of light rising above London from Victoria Tower Gardens to mark the centenary of the entry of Britain into the war.

Tower of London
Between 5 August (the centenary of the first full day of the war) and 11 November (Remembrance Day) 2014 at the Tower of London, a ceramic poppy was planted for each British and Commonwealth soldier who died, making up the artwork titled Blood Swept Lands and Seas of Red.

See also
First World War centenary
Armistice Day centenary

References

External links
Germany's Great War commemorations are filled with shame (The Independent)
Scotland commemorates World War One centenary (BBC News)

 
2014 in Europe
2014 in military history
July 2014 events in Europe
August 2014 events in Europe